Strass, Stras, or Straß may refer to:

Places in Austria
 Strass im Zillertal, a municipality in Tyrol
 Straß in Steiermark, a municipality in Styria
 Straß im Straßertale, a municipality in Lower Austria
 Straß im Attergau, a municipality in Upper Austria

Other uses
 Rhinestone or strass
 Syndicat du travail sexuel (STRASS), a sex worker organisation in France.

People with the surname 
 Barbara Strass (born 1974), Austrian former international team handball player
 Beata Sabina Straas or Strass (before 1737–1773)
 David Stras, a professor of law at the University of Minnesota Law School
 Georg Friedrich Strass (1701–1773), Alsatian jeweler who invented the rhinestone